Vincent Guérin (born 22 November 1965) is a French former professional footballer who played as a central midfielder.

Career
Guérin was born in Boulogne-Billancourt. In a career stretching from 1984 to 2002, he played for Stade Brestois 29, Matra Racing, Montpellier Hérault, Paris Saint-Germain, Heart of Midlothian in Scotland and, finally, with Red Star 93.

With Paris Saint Germain he won one Ligue 1 in 1994, placed second in 1993, 1996 and 1997, won the Coupe de France twice, in 1993 and 1995, won one Coupe de la Ligue in 1995, and one Cup Winners' Cup in 1996. He was also a finalist in the Cup Winners' Cup in 1997, and won another Coupe de France in 1990 with Montpellier.

With France he won the UEFA Under 21 European Cup in 1988 (13 matches played), and earned 19 full international caps, scoring 2 goals, as well as participating at Euro 1996.

International goals
Scores and results list France's goal tally first, score column indicates score after each Guérin goal.

Doping controversy
In 1997, the French Football Federation moved to suspend Guérin after he failed a drugs test administered after a PSG game on 5 October. Guérin appealed unsuccessfully to the FFF's doping appeals commission, who awarded him an 18-month ban, 12 months of which were suspended. Guérin subsequently appealed to the French federal Administrative Court at Versaille, contesting the FFF's decision on several counts. The court at Versailles upheld one of Guérin's contentions, that the drugs test was improperly administered, and thus decreed that the entire process should be deemed void. Resultantly, the FFF-imposed suspension was annulled.

Honours
Montpellier
Coupe de France: 1989–90

Paris Saint-Germain 	
Division 1: 1993–94
Coupe de France: 1992–93, 1994–95
Coupe de la Ligue: 1994–95
UEFA Cup Winners' Cup: 1995–96

Individual
Division 1 Player of the Year: 1994–95
French Player of the Year: 1997

References

External links
Profile at londonhearts.com

1965 births
Living people
Sportspeople from Boulogne-Billancourt
French footballers
France under-21 international footballers
France international footballers
French sportspeople in doping cases
Association football midfielders
UEFA Euro 1996 players
Stade Brestois 29 players
Racing Club de France Football players
Montpellier HSC players
Paris Saint-Germain F.C. players
Heart of Midlothian F.C. players
Red Star F.C. players
Ligue 1 players
Scottish Premier League players
French expatriate footballers
Expatriate footballers in Scotland
French expatriate sportspeople in Scotland
Doping cases in association football
Paris Saint-Germain F.C. non-playing staff
Footballers from Hauts-de-Seine